The turnip is a root vegetable. 

Turnip or The Turnip may also refer to:

 Turnip (terminology), three vegetables called turnips (including turnips)
 "The Turnip", a German fairy tale collected by the Brothers Grimm
 Charles Townshend, 2nd Viscount Townshend (1674–1738), English politician nicknamed "Turnip" Townshend for promoting the cultivation of turnips
 Turnip Prize, a spoof prize recognising deliberately bad modern art
 Mr. Turnip, a character in the 1950s British television programme Whirligig
 Turnip (Chrono Cross), a playable character in the video game Chrono Cross

See also
 Turnip Rock, Michigan, United States, a small geological formation